Alsóörs is a village in Veszprém county, Hungary.

External links
 Street map (Hungarian)
 Aerialphotgraphs of Alsóörs

References 

Populated places in Veszprém County